Transport in West Virginia is handled by the West Virginia Department of Transportation (WVDOT) which employs more than 6,000 in West Virginia.

Transportation in West Virginia includes the following.

Roads

Interstate highways

U.S. Highways

West Virginia State Highways

Airports
Eastern West Virginia Regional Airport
Elkins-Randolph County Airport
Greater Cumberland Regional Airport
Greenbrier Valley Airport
Mercer County Airport
Mid-Ohio Valley Regional Airport
Morgantown Municipal Airport
North Central West Virginia Airport
Potomac Airfield
Raleigh County Memorial Airport
Tri-State Airport
Wheeling Ohio County Airport
Yeager Airport

Railroads

While West Virginia was once crisscrossed with commercial and passenger railroad networks, the decline of the coal and timber industries, coupled with the rise of the automobile, led to a sharp drop in track mileage in the state. Many of the former railroad grades are used as trails for hiking and biking throughout the state's numerous woodlands.

Today, West Virginia is serviced by two Amtrak lines: one that cuts through the southern portion of the state, including stops in Huntington and Charleston, and one that cuts through the state's Eastern Panhandle, including stops in Martinsburg and Harpers Ferry.  The Eastern Panhandle is also serviced during the week by MARC's Brunswick commuter rail line, which terminates in Martinsburg. Commercial railroads still operate in the state, mainly hauling coal to inland ports such as Huntington-Tristate (the nation's largest inland port) and Pittsburgh.

Bridges and tunnels
As a mountainous state, bridges and tunnels play an important role in transportation in West Virginia. Notable bridges and tunnels include:
New River Gorge Bridge – near Fayetteville, WV
Silver Bridge – Point Pleasant, WV
Silver Memorial Bridge – Henderson, WV to Gallipolis, OH
Wheeling Suspension Bridge – Wheeling, WV
East River Mountain Tunnel – near Bluefield, WV to near Rocky Gap, VA
Fort Henry Bridge – Wheeling, WV
Veterans Memorial Bridge – Weirton, WV to Steubenville, OH

Rapid transit
Morgantown Personal Rapid Transit

Rivers

Rivers with commercial barge traffic and docks in West Virginia include:
 Ohio
 Kanawha (a tributary of the Ohio)
 Monongahela (The Mon and the Allegheny Rivers meet to form the Ohio in Pittsburgh, Pennsylvania.)
 Little Kanawha (a tributary of the Ohio)
 Big Sandy (a tributary of the Ohio)
 Elk (a tributary of the Kanawha)
 Pocatalico (a tributary of the Kanawha)
 Mill Creek (a tributary of the Ohio)

Navigation locks and dams in West Virginia:

 On the Ohio
 New Cumberland Locks and Dam
 Pike Island Locks and Dam
 Hannibal Locks and Dam
 Willow Island Locks and Dam
 Belleville Locks and Dam
 Racine Locks and Dam
 Robert C. Byrd Locks and Dam

 On the Kanawha
London Lock and Dam
Marmet Lock and Dam
Winfield Lock and Dam
On the Monogahela
Morgantown Lock and Dam
Hildebrand Lock and Dam
Opekiska Lock and Dam

See also
 Plug-in electric vehicles in West Virginia

References